Eustomias jimcraddocki is a species of abyssal barbeled dragonfish of the family Stomiidae, found in the western North Atlantic. Eustomias jimcraddocki can grow to a length of  SL.

References

Stomiidae
Fish described in 2004